Patricia Stephens may refer to:
 Patricia Stephens Due, African-American civil rights activist
 Patricia Stephens (badminton), American badminton player